Juan Ramón Jara Martínez (born 6 August 1970) is a retired football defender from Paraguay.

Club career
Jara started his career with Olimpia in Paraguay before moving to Argentina to play for clubs such as Rosario Central, Independiente and Colón de Santa Fe. He spent his best years playing for Rosario Central, where he earned than 100 caps, and was part of the team that finished as runners-up in the 1998 Copa CONMEBOL. Jara then returned to Paraguay to play again for Olimpia and then had brief stints at Nueva Chicago (Argentina), Emelec (Ecuador), Nacional and 3 de Febrero (Paraguay) before finally playing for Portuguesa Fútbol Club of Venezuela in 2007.

International career
Jara made his international debut in the Paraguay national football team on 10 June 1993 in a friendly match against Mexico (3-1 loss), substituting Carlos Gamarra in the 75th minute. He obtained a total number of 17 international caps, scoring no goals for the national side.

Jara was in the Paraguay national football team that competed at the 1992 Olympic games. Be also participated in a few matches for the 1998 FIFA World Cup qualifiers.

Honours

Club
 Olimpia
 Torneo República: 1992

References

External links

playerhistory

1970 births
Living people
Paraguayan footballers
Club Olimpia footballers
Rosario Central footballers
Club Atlético Independiente footballers
Club Atlético Colón footballers
Nueva Chicago footballers
C.S. Emelec footballers
Club Nacional footballers
Paraguay international footballers
Expatriate footballers in Argentina
Expatriate footballers in Ecuador
Paraguayan expatriate footballers
Footballers at the 1992 Summer Olympics
Olympic footballers of Paraguay
1993 Copa América players
1995 Copa América players
1997 Copa América players
Argentine Primera División players
Sportspeople from Asunción
Association football fullbacks